Roland Rainer (1 May 1910 – 10 April 2004) was an Austrian architect.

Born in Klagenfurt, Roland Rainer decided to become an architect when he was 18, so he studied at the Vienna University of Technology. His thesis was about the Karlsplatz in Vienna. Then, he left Austria visiting the Netherlands and the German Academy for Urban Design in Berlin. He became a Member of the ruling Nazi Party and endorsed their policies in his theoretical works. After World War II, he returned to Austria and continued writing, including his most famous work Urban design prose.

He was then called to several universities: the Technical University of Berlin, the Technical University at Brunswick, Technion - Israel Institute of Technology, and the Technical University of Munich. In 1953, Rainer became professor for housing, urban design, and land use planning at the Leibniz University Hannover. In 1954, he became professor for structural engineering at the Graz University of Technology, which forced him to commute between Graz and Hannover. From 1954, Rainer led the Master School for Architecture at the Academy of Fine Arts Vienna.

From 1956 to 1962, one of his most significant works, the Wiener Stadthalle in Vienna, was built. On July 1, 1958, Rainer was commissioned with the development of the zoning plan by the town council of Vienna. From 1987, Rainer was chairman of the curia for art of the Austrian Decoration for Science and Art. He was also a constant critic of environmental destruction and bad constructions. In 1967 he took part in the international competition of urbanist concept for Bratislava-Petrzalka district in Slovakia.

In 2006 the Roland-Rainer-Platz in front of the Wiener Stadthalle was named after him.

Honours and awards
 1954: City of Vienna Prize for Architecture
 1962: Austrian Cross of Honour for Science and Art
 1962: Grand Austrian State Prize for Architecture
 1969: Austrian Bauherrenpreis for "garden village" development at Puchenau, in Linz
 1973: Honorary Member ("Honorary Fellow") of the American Institute of Architects
 1979: Austrian Decoration for Science and Art
 1985: Honorary Ring of the City of Vienna
 2000: Grand Decoration of Honour in Gold with Star for Services to the Republic of Austria
 2006: Austrian Bauherrenpreis for the Roland-Rainer-Siedlung garden city development in St. Pölten (posthumously)

References

External links

 Puchenau II Garden City

1910 births
2004 deaths
Architects from Klagenfurt
TU Wien alumni
Academic staff of the Technical University of Munich
Academic staff of the University of Hanover
Academic staff of the Academy of Fine Arts Vienna
Recipients of the Austrian Decoration for Science and Art
Recipients of the Grand Austrian State Prize
Recipients of the Grand Decoration with Star for Services to the Republic of Austria
Academic staff of the Technical University of Braunschweig